Dynastini is a tribe of rhinoceros beetles in the family Scarabaeidae.

Subtribes and genera
BioLib includes:
subtribe Chalcosomina Rowland & Miller, 2012
 Chalcosoma Hope, 1837
 Debeckius Allsopp, 2022 - monotypic Debeckius beccarii (Gestro, 1876) has also been placed in genus Beckius and originally Chalcosoma
 Eupatorus Burmeister, 1847
 Haploscapanes Arrow, 1908
 Pachyoryctes Arrow, 1908

subtribe Dynastina MacLeay, 1819
 Augosoma Burmeister, 1841
 Dynastes MacLeay, 1819 - type genus
 Golofa Hope, 1837
 Megasoma Kirby, 1825

subtribe Xylotrupina Hope, 1838
 Allomyrina Arrow, 1911 (including Trypoxylus)
 Endebius van Lansberge, 1880
 Xylotrupes Hope, 1837

References

External links

Dynastinae
Beetle tribes